Diamond Cut Diamond may refer to:

 Diamond Cut Diamond (fairy tale), an Indian fairy tale
 Diamond Cut Diamond (film), a British film 
 "Diamond Cut Diamond", an episode of the British television series The Avengers
 Diamond Cut Diamond, a card trick invented by Alex Elmsley